Lindsay Davenport was the defending champion but lost in the semifinals to Mary Pierce.

Pierce won in the final 6–7, 6–0, 6–2 against Conchita Martínez.

Seeds
A champion seed is indicated in bold text while text in italics indicates the round in which that seed was eliminated. The top eight seeds received a bye to the second round.

  Lindsay Davenport (semifinals)
  Amanda Coetzer (semifinals)
  Monica Seles (third round)
  Mary Pierce (champion)
  Iva Majoli (quarterfinals)
  Conchita Martínez (final)
  Irina Spîrlea (second round)
  Anna Kournikova (quarterfinals)
  Patty Schnyder (third round)
  Lisa Raymond (quarterfinals)
  Ruxandra Dragomir (third round)
  Joannette Kruger (first round)
  Brenda Schultz-McCarthy (first round)
  Barbara Paulus (third round)
  Barbara Schett (second round)
  Maria Vento (first round)

Draw

Finals

Top half

Section 1

Section 2

Bottom half

Section 3

Section 4

External links
 ITF tournament edition details

Amelia Island Championships
1998 WTA Tour